Razane Jammal (born on 7 August 1987) is a British-Lebanese actress, best known for her roles in the Netflix Original series Paranormal, and her work in films by Kanye West, Robert Guédiguian, Tobe Hooper and Oliver Assayas. She plays Lyta Hall in the 2022 Netflix adaptation of Neil Gaiman's The Sandman.

Biography

Early life
Jammal was born and raised in Beirut, Lebanon. She started acting in television commercials at age 15, taking part in regional campaigns in the Middle East. At age 18 she moved to London, and was eventually cast in her first film role in 2009 in Carlos by Olivier Assayas.

Career
Her breakout role was in 2010's Carlos, followed by horror director Tobe Hooper's Djinn in 2012. In 2012, she was also part of the cast for Kanye West's debut short film screened at the Cannes Film Festival, Cruel Summer. In 2014 she starred with Liam Neeson in A Walk Among the Tombstones (2014). In 2015, she starred in Robert Guédiguian's Don't Tell Me The Boy Was Mad, which premiered at the 2015 Cannes Film Festival. She played the role of Maggie in the Netflix Original series Paranormal, based on the books by Ahmed Khaled Tawfik. The series is directed by Amr Salama and Majid Al Ansari.

In May 2021, it was announced that Jammal had joined the cast of The Sandman for Netflix, based on Neil Gaiman's DC Comics graphic novel.

Filmography

References

External links 
 
 

Living people
Actresses from Beirut
1987 births
Lebanese film actresses
Lebanese television actresses
21st-century Lebanese actresses